The 2007 Mid-Eastern Athletic Conference baseball tournament began on May 17 and ended on May 20 at Marty L. Miller Field, on the campus of Norfolk State University in Norfolk, Virginia.  It was a six-team double elimination tournament.   won the tournament, as they have done each year but one since 1999.  The Wildcats claimed the Mid-Eastern Athletic Conference's automatic bid to the 2007 NCAA Division I baseball tournament.

Format and seeding
The top six finishers from the regular season were seeded one through six based on conference winning percentage only, with the top seed playing the sixth seed, second seed playing the fifth, and so on for first round matchups.  The winners advanced in the winners' bracket, while first round losers played elimination games.  The format meant that  was left out of the field.

Bracket and results
Bracket to be added

Game results

All-Tournament Team
The following players were named to the All-Tournament Team.

Outstanding Performer
Angel Mercado was named Tournament Outstanding Performer.  Mercado was an infielder for Bethune-Cookman.

References

Tournament
Mid-Eastern Athletic Conference Baseball Tournament
Mid-Eastern Athletic Conference Baseball
Mid-Eastern Athletic Conference Baseball